Uniyal is a Garhwali Brahmin  surname mostly used in the Indian state of Uttarakhand.

Notable people 
 Amit Uniyal (born 1981), Indian cricketer
 Subodh Uniyal, Indian politician, member of Uttarakhand Legislative Assembly representing the Bharatiya Janata Party, cabinet minister in the Government of Uttarakhand.
 Sunil Uniyal, Indian politician from Uttarakhand representing the Bharatiya Janata Party, mayor of Dehradun since 2018.

References

Surnames
Indian surnames
Surnames of Hindustani origin
Hindu surnames
Himalayan peoples
Brahmin communities of Uttarakhand